From April 2–3, 1956, a large, deadly tornado outbreak affected the Great Plains, parts of the South, and the upper Midwest in the contiguous United States. The outbreak produced 47 tornadoes, including an F5 tornado that devastated the Hudsonville and Standale areas in the U.S. state of Michigan on April 3. It was one of three tornadoes to move across southwest Lower Michigan on that day. A fourth tornado struck north of the Manistee area. The Hudsonville-Standale tornado killed 17 and injured 292. These tornadoes were part of a tornado outbreak that took place on April 2–3, 1956, across the U.S Midwest and the Great Lakes regions. In addition to the fatalities in Kansas, Oklahoma, Michigan and Berlin, Wisconsin, three people were killed in Tennessee, one person in Kentucky and two more people in Wisconsin. In total, 38 were killed during the entire event.

Background

Tuesday, April 3, 1956, was a warm and humid day across most of the Midwestern U.S., the Great Lakes and the Ohio Valley. Temperatures in the areas affected by the worst of the outbreak were well into the 70s °F, approaching  in Michigan, with anomalously high dew points—the latter exceeding  near the shoreline of Lake Michigan. A potent low-pressure area accompanied an intense mid-latitude cyclone with a pronounced dry line located near the western Great Lakes. An attendant warm front extended eastward over Wisconsin, a vigorous cold front southward through Illinois. In tandem with the advancing trough, a strong jet stream with winds up to  extended over Little Rock, Arkansas, and impinged on the Upper Midwest. Prior to the arrival of the storms in the region, schools had closed earlier than usual due to the threat of severe weather. By late afternoon, the cold front crossed over the western Great Lakes including Lake Michigan.

Confirmed tornadoes

In addition to confirmed tornadoes, there were several unconfirmed but possible tornadoes. An F2 tornado may have hit east of Ogdensburg, Wisconsin, destroying a general store and a rural school. Nine barns were damaged or destroyed as well. A tornado may have also overturned two buildings and uprooted trees near Pana, Illinois. In addition to a confirmed F2 tornado near Topeka, Indiana, two other unconfirmed tornadoes may have hit northwest of LaGrange and at Emma, destroying or damaging numerous buildings, including a home and a barn that were blown down, and throwing two people from a horse and buggy, neither of whom was injured.

April 2 events

April 3 events

Newkirk, Oklahoma/Grenola–Toronto, Kansas

A long-tracked tornado family of at least two tornadoes—both of which were themselves tornado families—began near Newkirk, Oklahoma. The first tornado (F4) quickly intensified to near-F5 intensity just south of the Oklahoma–Kansas state line. In the area, one home was completely swept away and many trees were debarked. In Kansas, the F4 tornado passed south of Maple City, east of Grenola, and northwest of Howard. Near Maple City and Otto, a plastic belt was found embedded in a broken tree. F4 damage was reported south of Grenola before the tornado lifted near Howard. The second tornado (F4) formed southwest of Toronto, leveling one home, killing one man, totaling another home, injuring 3, both 1/2 mile west of town, and leveling a seven-room home just north of town. A trailer was destroyed as well, killing a baby inside.

Cedar Point–Strong City–Eskridge–Nortonville, Kansas

This long-tracked tornado family of five or more tornadoes began near Cedar Point, where it unroofed a home and destroyed a barn. The first member of the family lifted near Cedar Point, and the second tornado developed west of Strong City. Near Strong City, a car was thrown , injuring the driver. This tornado then lifted and reformed into a third tornado that passed west of Bushong, west of Harveyville, and north of Dover. South of Bushong, a boy was blown through a window and injured his leg. Near Dunlap, the tornado destroyed 16 cottages on Lake Kahola. A fourth tornado likely developed east of Harveyville and passed west of Auburn and through Seabrook. In Seabrook, the tornado broke glass, blew out bricks, and damaged trees and TV aerials. This tornado soon dissipated, and a fifth tornado (F3) touched down near Meriden, passing east of Rock Creek and east of Valley Falls before lifting northwest of Nortonville. F3 damage only occurred in the final  of the path as the tornado destroyed farms and killed cattle, including 19 in a single barn. Damage near Nortonville reached $250,000.

Miami–Quapaw, Oklahoma/Baxter Springs, Kansas/Webb City, Missouri

A large, violent, long-tracked tornado touched down just after midnight local time and struck the towns of Miami, Quapaw, and Baxter Springs. F4 damage occurred in Miami and Quapaw, with 46 injuries and 56 homes damaged or destroyed in Miami alone. The tornado destroyed five more homes in Quapaw, with total Oklahoma losses estimated at $500,000. The tornado then crossed the Oklahoma–Kansas state line into Baxter Springs, destroying 14 homes, damaging 13, and causing $125,000 damage, with six injuries reported. A baseball grandstand was destroyed, and trees were uprooted as well. The tornado crossed into Missouri west of Joplin and passed through Webb City, damaging 30 homes and several businesses.

Saugatuck–Hudsonville–Standale, Michigan

Officially listed as a single tornado, but may have been a tornado family of two or more tornadoes, one of which was an F4 and the other an F5. The first (F4) tornado may have lifted near Holland, passing aloft over Zeeland before touching down as a second (F5) tornado just east of town. The second tornado then continued northeast before lifting northeast of Trufant.

Just before 6:00 PM EST, a tornado touched down on the beach near Saugatuck, Michigan, and proceeded , producing F4 damage and injuring seven people while destroying barns, outbuildings and garages. The tornado destroyed multiple homes, some of which were swept away. The historic lighthouse on the shore near Saugatuck was also leveled by the winds. Some reports indicate that the tornado dissipated near Holland and formed into a new, more powerful tornado southwest of the Grand Rapids metropolitan area at around 6:30 PM. Officially, however, a single continuous track is listed.

Homes in Hudsonville were cleanly swept away from their foundations, with only small pieces of debris recovered in some locations. At least one home was so obliterated that all the floor tiles had been completely scoured from the foundation. Vehicles nearby were tossed hundreds of yards and mangled beyond recognition. Extensive wind-rowing of debris was observed, and hundreds of trees were snapped and debarked as well. In all, the tornado destroyed numerous homes and businesses, especially in Standale. Some homes in this area were swept away as well. The tornado continued northeast, destroying a mobile home park before dissipating. Officially, 17 (possibly 18) people were killed and 292 others were injured by the storm. This was the last F5 (confirmed and/or possible) in the U.S. state of Michigan and occurred three years after the Flint Tornado that killed 116.

The tornado that struck the Grand Rapids area was the inspiration for the La Dispute song "Hudsonville, MI 1956". Meanwhile, Hudsonville would be hit directly by a brief, but strong F2 tornado just one year later, although that tornado caused no casualties.

See also
List of North American tornadoes and tornado outbreaks
List of F5 and EF5 tornadoes

Notes

References

Further reading

A
A
A
A
April 1956 events in the United States
1956 in Michigan